Guardian Force may refer to:
 Angel Wars
 Guardian Force (Final Fantasy), a form of Summon magic in Final Fantasy VIII
 Guardian Force (arcade game), 1998 arcade and Saturn shooter by Success
 Zoids: Guardian Force, 1999 anime series whose title refers to the fictional organization